General elections were held in Cambodia on Sunday, 29 July 2018 to elect members of the sixth National Assembly. Polling stations opened at 07:00 (ICT) and closed at 15:00. The number of registered voters has decreased for the first time since 1993 and was down 13% from the 2013 general elections. 

With the absence of a credible opposition, the elections were viewed as a formality to effectively solidify de facto one-party rule in the country, and were dismissed as sham elections by the international community. They resulted in a widely expected landslide victory for the ruling Cambodian People's Party (CPP), which won all 125 seats in the National Assembly. Despite calls to boycott the election, voter turnout was alleged to be 83.02%.

Background
The previous elections in July 2013 saw a fourth consecutive victory for the CPP, which won 68 seats in the National Assembly, with the opposition Cambodia National Rescue Party (CNRP) claiming the remaining 55 seats. Despite their huge gain in seats, the opposition decried the results and accused the CPP of poll fraud. As a result, the CNRP boycotted parliament in September 2013 and vowed not to enter parliament until electoral reforms had been made. The disputed results led to the outbreak of widespread anti-government protests.

On 10 April 2014, Prime Minister Hun Sen agreed to hold elections five months early in February 2018. However, the opposition rejected the suggestion, demanding elections be held as early as 2015 or mid-2016. On 22 July 2014, the political crisis officially ended and the opposition agreed to take their seats in parliament. It was also agreed that the next elections would be held in 2018. However, CNRP leader Sam Rainsy was stripped from parliamentary immunity, and then barred from returning to Cambodia after leaving the country. His request for a royal pardon was blocked by Sen, and in December 2016, his deputy Kem Sokha replaced him as Minority Leader.

On 11 February 2017, Rainsy resigned as President of the CNRP, and was succeeded by Sokha. On 3 September, Sokha was arrested and charged with treason, raising questions about the party's future. Another act of repression by the government was the closure of the Cambodia Daily newspaper. On 16 November 2017, the CNRP was forcibly dissolved, eliminating any real challenge to the long-ruling CPP. Its seats in parliament were distributed to three other parties.

Results

Reactions
The legitimacy of the 2018 elections was called into question by various commentators and media outlets. There were a record number of invalid ballots, accounting for 8.6% of the total votes cast, more than any votes received by a political party barring the CPP. Also, in areas away from the country's capital, voters claimed that CPP were using intimidation tactics in order to influence the elections' results.

Various international governments including Australia, Canada, the European Union, Japan and the United States dismissed the election results, and threatened to impose sanctions on Hun Sen's government. 

The governments of China, the Philippines, Laos and Thailand were among those to congratulate the CPP on their victory. Meanwhile the former opposition Cambodia National Rescue Party accused the National Election Committee of misleading the number of voter turnout.

References

Cambodia
2018 in Cambodia
Elections in Cambodia
July 2018 events in Asia